Young Hearts or  Jonge Harten  is a 1936 Dutch film directed and written by :nl:Charles Huguenot van der Linden and the German exile Heinz Josephson.

Cast
Rini Otte	... 	Annie
Leo de Hartogh	... 	Peter
Lizzy Dernburg	... 	Maja
Adriaan Van Hees... 	Hans
Martha Posno	... 	Sip

References

External links 
 

1936 films
Dutch black-and-white films
1930s Dutch-language films